Mystery Road is a 2013 Australian crime film with neo-Western elements and setting, written and directed by Ivan Sen. It was screened in the Special Presentation section at the 2013 Toronto International Film Festival. A film sequel entitled Goldstone was released in 2016, and TV series in 2018, all featuring Aaron Pedersen as the brooding Indigenous Australian detective Jay Swan.

Plot

Near the rural town of Winton, Queensland, a truck driver finds the body of a teenage Aboriginal girl named Julie Mason inside one of the drainage culverts under the road. Newly promoted Aboriginal Detective Jay Swan, recently returned from training in the city, investigates the murder. He learns that Julie used to exchange sex with truck drivers for money. He attempts to question another local Aboriginal girl, Tarni Williams, who was friends with Julie, but she refuses to speak to him. A boy gives Jay Julie's phone, which has several text messages to Jay's teenage daughter, Crystal. He visits his ex-wife, Mary, and speaks to Crystal. Jay searches a farm near where Julie's body was found and meets its owner, Sam Bailey. Jay later finds out that another teenage Aboriginal girl had also gone missing earlier.

One morning Jay goes to the radio tower where truck drivers would take girls, and Jay observes men taking something off a truck and driving it to what appears to be a drug lab. As he drives away, his police colleagues, Johnno and Constable Roberts, flag him down. Johnno attempts to intimidate Jay. Jay later asks his boss about Johnno and is told that Johnno had some unspecified trouble in his previous assignment and had to transfer here, but that he is close to making some big arrests.

Jay visits the motel where Julie used to go to have sex with truckers. The motel owner tells him about a white man registered under the name "William Smith", who drives a white hunting truck who had registered there.  Jay returns to Sam's farm, where he encounters Pete, who says his father isn't around, insults Jay, refuses to let him search his truck, and states that he works as a kangaroo hunter and is an expert shot. Jay goes back to the police station and pulls up Pete Bailey's police record, which shows a long criminal record, and that Pete had last been arrested for drug possession by another local police officer who had recently been killed on the job, but the file of the police investigation of the death of the slain police officer is missing. Jay visits the young widow of the deceased police officer, who tells him that the officer had been called to work by another, unnamed police officer on the night that he was killed.

Jay follows Johnno leaving the police station in a police car. Johnno switches vehicles and leaves in his own hunting truck, driving to a rest stop, where he meets a local drug dealer named Wayne Silverman. Jay later goes to Wayne's house and arrests him.  Wayne tells Jay that he deals drugs to local Aboriginal girls and then prostitutes them out when they can't pay. He says that he had stolen a car that contained heroin, but subsequently lost the drugs. Johnno interrupts the interrogation to release Wayne, who is his informant. Jay then discovers a further murder victim, Tarni. He then finds that Mary's house has been broken into and Crystal's whereabouts are unknown.

Jay stakes out the drug lab and sees a man in an orange car hand over Wayne to someone in a Land Rover. Johnno and Jay go to a restaurant, where Johnno ignores his questions, but states that he is looking for something that's missing, implying that its discovery will keep Crystal safe. Jay searches the house of the initial victim, Julie, finding several bags of heroin hidden in the TV. He calls Johnno to arrange their return at a hill off Mystery Road.

When he arrives first for the drop-off, Jay loads his hunting rifle and pistol. The orange car and Land Rover arrive and Jay hands over the heroin. Jay sees Pete's truck in the distance, and Pete uses his hunting rifle to wound Jay in the arm. A shootout ensues as Jay runs back to his car for cover. The man who is wearing a mask and was driving the orange car is shot by Johnno, using a hunting rifle from afar. Jay and Johnno shoot several of the men dead. Pete and Johnno exchange long-distance shots as Jay kills all the rest of the criminals as they attempt to flee, and then disables Pete's truck when he tries to drive away. Jay kills Pete, then spots the dead body of Johnno, and unmasks the car driver to discover he is Constable Roberts. Jay finds Sam Bailey shot through the neck in the Land Rover, sees scratch marks on the backseat and finds a necklace with the name "Julie" on it.

Jay returns to Winton and sees Mary and Crystal waiting for him. He gets out of the car, and the three stare at each other as the sun sets.

Cast

Reception

Critical response
Mystery Road received positive reviews from critics. On the review aggregator website Rotten Tomatoes, the film has a score of 92% based on reviews from 36 critics, with an average rating of 7.3/10. The website's consensus reads, "Mystery Road evokes classic Westerns while using its Australian outback setting to delve into a surprisingly layered -- and powerfully impactful -- array of social issues."

Tom Clift of FILMINK called it a "masterfully executed slice of storytelling that rates as one of our finest films of the past few years." Sandra Hall of The Sydney Morning Herald also gave a positive review, commenting that "Mystery Road's links to the classic Hollywood western are as obvious as its hero's cowboy boots and white hat but they do nothing to diminish its Australianness." Craig Mathieson of The Sunday Age called it a "deeply satisfying and slow-burning modern-day western set in outback New South Wales, Ivan Sen's outstanding film Mystery Road bridges the current divide in Australian cinema with a prominent and precise work."

Not all reviews were positive. Alex Doenau of Trespass commented "There simply isn't enough dynamism to justify Sen's story. Australian movies have to work harder to secure audiences beyond those who go to them out of a sense of duty or worthiness; Mystery Road simply doesn't go that far."

The film was a rare foreign screening at the 2014 Pyongyang International Film Festival, North Korea.

Accolades

Sequel and spin-off series
Sen wrote and directed a sequel to Mystery Road, entitled Goldstone. Pedersen reprises his role, and joining the cast is David Wenham, Alex Russell, David Gulpilil and Jacki Weaver. A spin-off six-part TV series also titled Mystery Road screened on the ABC in 2018, with Series 2 shown in 2020, and Series 3 Mystery Road: Origin in 2022.

References

External links
 
 

2013 films
2013 crime drama films
Australian crime drama films
Films adapted into television shows
Films about murder
Films set in Queensland
Neo-Western films
Films directed by Ivan Sen
2010s English-language films
Screen Australia films
Films about Aboriginal Australians